Guest House Paradiso is a 1999 British slapstick black comedy film written by and starring comic duo Rik Mayall and Adrian Edmondson, who also directed in his film directorial debut.

The film is a spin-off of their BBC comedy television series Bottom (in some territories, the DVD cover refers to it as Richie and Eddie's Bottom Movie). Mayall and Edmondson reprise their roles from the series respectively as Richie and Eddie, albeit with different surnames. The film was made at Ealing Studios and on location on the Isle of Wight, off Military Road A3055, between the villages of Afton and Brighstone.

Plot 
Richard "Richie" Twat (Rik Mayall) and Edward "Eddie" Elizabeth Ndingombaba (Adrian Edmondson) run the worst guest house in the United Kingdom. Their staff include a chef, an idiotic drunkard and an illegal immigrant who is unable to cook, and a waiter, who is implied to have checked into a psychiatric hospital. Both leave because of nonpayment for their employment, with the latter quitting because of the verbal abuse from his boss. The guests, including Mr Johnson (Bill Nighy), who reside in the pair's hotel are thoroughly dissatisfied by the poor service especially Richie's rudeness, and eventually decide to leave, except for the senile Mrs Foxfur (Fenella Fielding), who lives there.

Life seems bleak for Richie and Eddie, until it seemingly improves with the arrival of the "Nice family", headed by Mr Nice (Simon Pegg), and the famous Italian actress Gina Carbonara (Hélène Mahieu).  The Nice family are staying as it is the cheapest hotel in the country, and Gina's decision to stay in the grotty house is primarily down to her need to seek safety from her ill-tempered fiancé Gino Bolognese (Vincent Cassel). Without the chef, the duo are forced to cook meals for the guests; luckily, however, Richie comes across some fish which fell off a military lorry, heading away from the nearby nuclear power station. Unknown to both him and Eddie, the fish had been contaminated by a radiation leak due to the power station's poor maintenance and equally poor safety regulations.

Thanks to the pair promoting her stay to attract more guests, Gino eventually finds her, and after an elopement between the two, Gino attempts to rape Gina. Meanwhile, hours after serving the radioactive fish, everybody becomes violently ill, projectile-vomiting at high velocity and in huge quantities – all except for Gina Carbonara, the only guest who did not eat the fish due to Gino eating it all for himself. In a getaway, Richie and Eddie quickly pack their bags, and are serendipitously reunited with Gina, who they escape with. In an act of spontaneous nausea, every guest projectile-vomits on Gino at once, forcing him backwards out through a window and off a cliff into the ocean, killing him. Government agents arrive to hush up the incident and give Eddie and Richie £10 million, first-class tickets to the Caribbean, and new identities for both them and Gina, in exchange for their silence over the leak. The three accept the offer and head to the Caribbean and start a beach bar called "Beach Bar Paradiso". In the film's final scene, Eddie winks to the camera after commenting "How lucky [Gino] was the only fatality. Otherwise there'd be a moral question-mark hanging over our escape."

Cast 
 Rik Mayall as Richard "Richie" Twat 
 Adrian Edmondson as Edward "Eddie" Elizabeth Ndingombaba
 Vincent Cassel as Gino Giuseppe Bolognese
 Hélène Mahieu as Gina Tortellini Carbonara
 Bill Nighy as Mr. Johnson
 Kate Ashfield as Ms. Hardy
 Simon Pegg as Mr. Nice
 Fenella Fielding as Mrs. Foxfur
 Lisa Palfrey as Mrs. Nice
 Steve O'Donnell as Chef Lardy Barsto
 James D'Arcy as Newly Wedded Husband
 Kate Loustau as Newly Wedded Wife
 Paul Garcia as Screen Lover

Background 
Prior to the film's production in 1998, Rik Mayall was involved in a quad bike accident, almost killing him and resulting in Mayall being in a coma for some time. During his hospitalisation, Mayall and Edmondson began writing the script for the movie and were inspired to write the hotel backdrop after their stays at some during their tours of the Bottom Live shows. The title is taken from the 1988 film Cinema Paradiso.

Reception 
Empire gave the film a 2 out of 5 star rating, stating that "The boys toil incredibly hard to make the whole thing work and, while there are some hilarious moments, it is far too patchy for a full feature film."

References

External links 
 
 
 

1999 films
1999 comedy films
1999 directorial debut films
1990s black comedy films
Bottom (TV series)
British black comedy films
British slapstick comedy films
Films based on television series
Films directed by Adrian Edmondson
Films scored by Colin Towns
Films set in hotels
Films set in England
Films shot in England
Self-reflexive films
1990s English-language films
1990s British films